Bangaru Kodalu was an Indian Telugu-language Soap opera aired on  Gemini TV from 24 February 2020 to 6 February 2021 every Monday to Saturday for 211 episodes. The show starred Amar Sasanka, Mounika Devi, Priyanka and Divya Deepika in leading roles.

Cast 
 Amar Sasanka as Vikas
 Mounika Devi as Divya, Neelambari's best friend
 Priyanka as Neelambari aka Neelu (Vikas's Sister in law)
 Divya Deepika as Srija (Vikas's Sister in law)
Jaya kumar as Abhishek
 Raja Babu (Vikas's Grand father)
 Indu Anand as Neelambari (Vikas's Grand mother)
 Vijay as Arjun (Vikas's Father)
Vijaya as Sulochana (Vikas's mother)
 Sravya sruthi as Chandana (Vikas's Sister)
 Ranjitha as Rukmini ( Neelu's mother)
Surya as Neelu's father

Srihari as Akash, Neelu's love interest
Roopa Reddy (Akash's mother)
Shridhar (Akash's father)
Suryateja as Rudra
Kolli Praveen Chandra as Deva, police Inspector

Former cast
Smrithi as Srija's mother (replaced by Jahnavi Chowdary)
Jahnavi Chowdary as Srija's mother (replaced by Vanitha Reddy)

References

External links 
 

Indian television soap operas
Telugu-language television shows
2020 Indian television series debuts
Gemini TV original programming
2021 Indian television series endings